KKHI (95.9 FM) is a radio station broadcasting the K-Love Christian Contemporary format, licensed to Kaunakakai, Hawaii, United States. Its original call sign of KMKK-FM was licensed in April 2006. It changed its call sign to KNIT on April 24, 2015, and again to the current KKHI on January 26, 2016. The big signal of KKHI broadcasts Christian Contemporary music from Molokai to Maui. The station is owned by Educational Media Foundation.

References

External links
 KKHI profile at K-Love

Radio stations established in 2006
2006 establishments in Hawaii
Contemporary Christian radio stations in the United States
Educational Media Foundation radio stations
K-Love radio stations
KHI